Pleasant Valley is a town in St. Croix County, Wisconsin, United States. The population was 430 at the 2000 census.

Geography
According to the United States Census Bureau, the town has a total area of 18.0 square miles (46.7 km2), all of it land.

Demographics

As of the census of 2000, there were 430 people, 145 households, and 114 families residing in the town. The population density was 23.9 people per square mile (9.2/km2). There were 150 housing units at an average density of 8.3 per square mile (3.2/km2). The racial makeup of the town was 98.37% White, 0.23% African American, 0.23% Native American, 0.23% Asian, and 0.93% from two or more races. Hispanic or Latino of any race were 0.70% of the population.

There were 145 households, out of which 40.7% had children under the age of 18 living with them, 69.7% were married couples living together, 8.3% had a female householder with no husband present, and 20.7% were non-families. 10.3% of all households were made up of individuals, and 2.1% had someone living alone who was 65 years of age or older. The average household size was 2.97 and the average family size was 3.20.

In the town, the population was spread out, with 31.4% under the age of 18, 7.7% from 18 to 24, 29.8% from 25 to 44, 22.6% from 45 to 64, and 8.6% who were 65 years of age or older. The median age was 34 years. For every 100 females, there were 102.8 males. For every 100 females age 18 and over, there were 102.1 males.

The median income for a household in the town was $58,750, and the median income for a family was $60,750. Males had a median income of $42,083 versus $37,656 for females. The per capita income for the town was $22,074. None of the families and 0.5% of the population were living below the poverty line, including no under eighteens and none of those over 64.

References

External links
 Town of Pleasant Valley website
 St. Croix Central School District
 Official St. Croix County Zoning Map for Town of Pleasant Valley

Towns in St. Croix County, Wisconsin
Towns in Wisconsin